Gilahoba (also, Kelakhoba) is a village and municipality in the Qusar Rayon of Azerbaijan.  It has a population of 504.

References 

Populated places in Qusar District